The emrB-Lactobacillus RNA motif is a conserved RNA structure that was discovered by bioinformatics.
emrB-Lactobacillus motifs are found in bacteria of the genus Lactobacillus.

emrB-Lactobacillus RNAs are generally located in the 5′ untranslated regions of genes that encode EmrB, a kind of transporter.  This fact suggests that the RNAs function as cis-regulatory elements.  However, two factors call this conclusion into question.  First, emrB-Lactobacillus RNAs are also located nearby to their upstream genes.  Regulation of an upstream gene is unusual in bacteria.  Second, some emrB-Lactobacillus RNAs are located nearby to transposase genes.  The presence of these genes could suggest that emrB-Lactobacillus RNAs have a function related to transposons, although it is also consistent with the view that the apparent transposons have merely replicated nearby to the emrB-Lactobacillus RNAs by coincidence, and that there is no functional relationship between the two entities.
Thus, it is unknown whether emrB-Lactobacillus RNAs function as cis-regulatory RNAs or as small RNAs.

References

Non-coding RNA